The 10th Ward is a division of the city of New Orleans, Louisiana. The 10th Ward is one of the 17 wards of New Orleans. The ward is one of the city's Uptown wards, formerly the old Faubourg Lafayette annexed by New Orleans in the 1850s.

Boundaries
The 10th Ward stretches back from the Mississippi River to St. Charles Avenue, across which is the 3rd Ward. The lower boundary is Calliope Street, across which is the 1st Ward of New Orleans (better known as warehouse district). The upper boundary is Jackson Avenue, across which lies the 11th Ward.

Cityscape and landmarks
Near the river the ward includes part of the Lower Garden District and the former location of America's first experiment with large-scale public housing, started here in 1937, when, as part of the New Deal, President Franklin D. Roosevelt signed the loan to commence construction of the former St. Thomas Housing Project. In Central City it includes the Oretha Castle Haley commercial district.

Residents
The 10th Ward has been home to such notables as jazz musicians Buddy Bolden and George Brunies

History
In 1718, the City of New Orleans was established. The city was later divided into many neighborhoods, streets, and squares. Faubourg Lafayette is one of the many neighborhoods of New Orleans. Faubourg Lafayette was united by an act of legislation, prior to being classified as an official neighborhood. However, unlike most of the other neighborhoods in the city, Faubourg Lafayette once belonged to another region of Louisiana before it united with the great city of New Orleans. This area was originally part of the city of Lafayette, Louisiana before New Orleans and Lafayette's legislation consolidated in making it great one big city. Many other neighborhoods like Faubourg Nuns and Faubourg Delassize were also a part of Lafayette, Louisiana prior to this consolidation. 
	
In 1818, Faubourg Lafayette was bought as a neighborhood and became a subdivision in 1824. In its newborn years as a city, it was cut into blocks and squares by John Poultney. Poultney acquired this neighborhood from Madame Rousseau, who like Samuel Herman bought his neighborhood from the heirs of Valery Delaissize. Both of these neighborhoods started as plantations, but the new owners decided to downsize them in order to make more living space available for the growing population.

In 1796,  Bertrand Gravier helped enlarge Faubourg by including Phillipa St., which is now called Poydress Street. Years later, in 1997, Gravier died and Jean Gravier, his brother, was appointed to be the new owner of this prosperous estate. He continued in his brother's footsteps by further extending the Faubourg to Circus Street, which is currently regarded to as Rampart Street. As Jean Gravier continued to expand the Faubourg region, he included land that was located near Poydras St., and approximately 40 feet in width, for a Canal. This canal linked  with an agency in Bayou St. John, and flowed into an area which was called Hagan Avenue; although, this region between the canal is now noted as Norman C. Francis Parkway. In addition, to these expansions, Jean Gravier also designated a tract for a basin that linked to Canal St. During this time, the basin was an uninhabited district of land  which was allocated for the community. He later called this Basin “Place Gravier”.

Jean Gravier didn't realize that the canal and Place Gravier would become the basis of a dispute between the City of New Orleans and the Carrollton Railroad Company. At this time, the Carrollton Railroad company possessed the canal, the basin, and asserted ownership of segments of Place Gravier.  The dispute between the City of New Orleans, and the railroad company concluded when the Supreme Court of the Territory of Orleans announced a judgement in support of Jean Gravier, on May 23, 1805.

Later in 1841, the Supreme Court of the state of Louisiana, pronounced that the Canal and Basin were property of to the Railroad Company. However, years later in 1876, the Supreme Court altered their judgement and decided that the “Place Gravier” would be owned by the City of New Orleans and be a location for the general public. In 1897, the City of New Orleans took legal action against Philip Werlien for possession of this basin. This location was declared to be public property as stated by the judgment the Supreme Court announced in 1841. The City of New Orleans won the lawsuit against Werlien and the Supreme Court of the state of Louisiana. Werlein took the litigation to the Supreme Court of the United States and it rendered a judgment in support of him. The Supreme Court of the United States reasoned that the City of New Orleans had lost ownership of Place Gravier. Philip Werlien was able to obtain possession of this disputed property, which is now the site of the Hotel de Sotoe.

Faubourg Lafayette is distinctive in its perimeters because of its unique history from vast contributors. Faubourg Lafayette is part of the upper section of New Orleans. The perimeters of Faubourg Lafayette are Saint Charles Street, Calliope Street, Jackson Avenue, and Simon Bolivar Avenue. This area is known for its diverse mixture of businesses, personal homes, schools, and many main attractions for tourist.

References

10